Priorité Monaco, styled Primo! (First!), is a Monegasque political party. It was founded by Stéphane Valeri in September 2017. It won the 2018 general election.

Electoral history

National Council elections

References

2017 establishments in Monaco
Political parties established in 2017
Monarchist parties in Monaco